Malayali Australians (Malayalee Australian) are Australians whose ancestors, or themselves, identify as ethnic Malayalis (also called Keralites) and speak Malayalam. Malayali Australians constitute one group of Indian Australians. Malayalis originate from the South Indian state of Kerala, and are one of the fastest-growing populations in Australia with 78,738 speakers as per 2021 census. Majority of this population has arrived in Australia after the year 2007. The state and territory breakup of Malayalam speakers per the 2021 census is:

 New South Wales - 20,890
 Queensland - 13,003
 South Australia - 4,809
 Tasmania - 615
 Victoria - 25,342
 Western Australia - 9,697
 Australian Capital Territory - 2,766
 Northern Territory - 1,601

The majority proportion of this population is associated with the 25-39 year age cohort (53%), and the estimated average age of this population is approximately 32 years. Both the genders are well represented with more number of males (52%) compared to females (48%). A vast majority of this population over the age of 15 years are married (71%), and this is followed by people who have never married (11%). More than two-thirds of this population has indicated an affiliation with Christianity and this is followed by almost a quarter of this population indicating an affiliation with Hinduism. There is also a growing number of people who have no religious affiliation. The population is well represented across different income groups, and the estimated average individual income is $45,000 per annum. Almost a quarter of this population indicated that they are Australian citizens.

Notable Malayali Australians
Sajeev Koshy, Community Health
Arjun Nair, first class cricketer
Mathai Varghese, pure mathematician
Peter Varghese, public servant

See also

Indian Australians
Malayali people

References

External links
http://www.abs.gov.au/websitedbs/D3310114.nsf/home/2016+Census+National

 
Indian Australians
Immigration to Australia
Malayali diaspora
Indian diaspora in Australia